The Rochester Jeffersons from Rochester, New York played from 1898 to 1925, including play in the National Football League from 1920 to 1925.

History

Formed as an amateur outfit by a rag-tag group of Rochester-area teenagers after the turn of the 20th century (a 1925 report has the team being founded in 1898), the team became known as the Jeffersons in reference to the locale of their playing field on Jefferson Avenue. Around 1908 a teenager by the name of Leo Lyons joined with the club as a player, and within two years began to manage, finance, and promote the team on a full-time basis.

For their first decade of their existence the "Jeffs" played other amateur and semi-pro teams from the upstate New York area such as the Rochester Scalpers and the Oxfords. From 1914 to 1917, the team grew stronger with opponents from Buffalo and Syracuse. In 1916, they were the New York State champions. By 1917, the Jeffs had started to look past state borders not only for big-name opponents, but for big-name talent as well.

At the end of October 1917, Lyons managed to secure a match against the country's greatest team, the Canton Bulldogs, who had the legendary Jim Thorpe as their star attraction. Thorpe's squad crushed the Jeffs 41–0, but the audacity of challenging such a superior team to a match won Lyons and his club a bit of notoriety. In 1920, Leo Lyons was at the Hupmobile showroom in Canton, Ohio to become an original member of the newly formed American Professional Football Association, which would be known in two years as the National Football League. The NFL recognizes that 1920 meeting as the founding of the National Football League.

As it turned out, Rochester was more interested in its thriving sandlot football circuit  than in professional football.  The Jeffersons had attempted to recruit some of the country's best college players, but the fans would rather see local boys play, and, by 1922, the Jeffersons' on-field product was enough to annihilate local teams (thus discouraging fans from coming out as blowouts were assured) but, after some initial modest success, not good enough to compete with the rest of the NFL (thus also discouraging fans from coming out as the Jeffersons were almost assured to lose). As a result, the teams attendance suffered badly, with the local semi-pro teams drawing much better. Without a consistent draw at the gate, the team's finances, play on the field and ability to draw star talent likewise suffered, and the team finished its last four seasons without a single league win. (This was not to say that the team went totally winless in this span; in a 1924 contest, the Jeffersons defeated the Pottsville Maroons of the Anthracite League; the Maroons, the class of their league, moved to the NFL in 1925, when it contended for the NFL title.) In 1920, John Barsha played for the team.  From 1921-24, two-time First Team All Pro Doc Alexander played for the team.  After an unsuccessful last-ditch effort to lure Red Grange to Rochester (he instead signed with the Chicago Bears), the team suspended operations after the 1925 NFL season; by this point, the team had been losing money (to the point where Lyons' house had been foreclosed upon because of his dumping of virtually all his assets into the team) and had been a traveling team for two seasons (1924 and 1925). The team remained technically suspended for 1926 and 1927, but allowed its franchise to expire in 1928. Lyons stayed on with the NFL as an unofficial historian after the Jeffersons' folding.

Notable players
John Barsha (born Abraham Barshofsky; 1898–1976)
Elmer Oliphant 1920 edition of the team

Season records

References

External links
 Carroll, Bob. THE TOWN THAT HATED PRO FOOTBALL. Pro Football Researchers Association Coffin Corner: Vol. III, 1981.
    The Official Rochester Jeffersons Website 
 

 
American football teams established in 1898
American football teams disestablished in 1928
Defunct National Football League teams
Jeffersons
Defunct American football teams in New York (state)
New York Pro Football League teams
1898 establishments in New York (state)
1928 disestablishments in New York (state)